Moosa Khalfan Said (born 4 April 1988) is a Qatari cyclist.

Palmares
2006
 National Road Race Champion

External links
Moosa Khalfan Said on CQranking

References

1988 births
Living people
Qatari male cyclists
Cyclists at the 2006 Asian Games
Cyclists at the 2010 Asian Games
Cyclists at the 2014 Asian Games
Asian Games competitors for Qatar